Slick Rock is a small unincorporated community located in western San Miguel County, Colorado, United States. Slick Rock sits next to the Dolores River and is named for the surrounding sandstone formations.

History
Slick Rock was originally known as Gladel. The Gladel post office opened in 1922, but closed in 1929. The Slick Rock post office opened in 1941, but has since closed. Slick Rock addresses are now served by the Egnar post office with the ZIP code 81325.

See also

Colorado
Bibliography of Colorado
Index of Colorado-related articles
Outline of Colorado
List of places in Colorado

References

External links

Unincorporated communities in San Miguel County, Colorado
Unincorporated communities in Colorado